Re:member may refer to:

 Re:member (album), a 2018 album by Ólafur Arnalds
 "Re:member" (Flow song), ninth single of the Japanese band Flow

See also 

 Remember (disambiguation)